Timothy Martin Lees (born 24 January 1986) is an English football player and football coach. He is currently assistant manager of Macclesfield.

Club career
Lees signed schoolboy forms at Bolton Wanderers after being released by Everton Academy. His recorded semi-professional clubs include Stalybridge Celtic, Wingate & Finchley, AFC Hayes, and Radcliffe Borough.

Coaching career
Lees was employed as Technical Coach for Pepsi in 2007, working on global events with David Beckham, Thierry Henry and Ronaldinho. In 2008 he worked as Youth Development Phase Coach at England’s first full-time training model at WatfordFC Academy with 12-16 age groups. In 2010 he moved to Wigan Athletic as Youth Development Lead, under Roberto Martinez, before moving to Liverpool football club in 2013 working alongside Michael Beale and Pepijn Lijnders. Lees became Academy Director at American professional club St Louis FC (now St Louis City SC) in 2015, overseeing the 7–23's youth structure and as First Team coach.

Lees was Head Coach at Warrington Rylands, owned by Paul Stretford, winning back-to-back promotions and the FA Vase at Wembley Stadium in 2021. 

On 31 October 2022, Lees was appointed assistant manager of Northern Premier League Division One West club Macclesfield to David McNabb, the duo moving over from Warrington Rylands.

Lees has published two coaching books and is co-owner of Soccer School UK International Camps.

Other career

Lees played for England semi-professional Budweiser team at the FIFA 2006 World Cup finals in Germany, selected and managed by Jamie Redknapp. He was later chosen to represent Great Britain in the Channel 4 2006 TV series The Pepsi Max World Challenge, chosen from a pool of 17,000 entrants and open to players not signed to professional football clubs. The series had a $100,000 prize for the winning country and involved David Beckham, Ronaldinho, Thierry Henry, Carlos Puyol, Roberto Carlos and Alessandro Nesta. The show took place in Rio De Janeiro, Milan, London, Madrid and Cairo. Lees has directed several football commercials and advertisements.

References

1986 births
Living people
English footballers
Atherton Collieries A.F.C. players
Stalybridge Celtic F.C. players
Leek Town F.C. players
Wingate & Finchley F.C. players
A.F.C. Hayes players
Wigan Athletic F.C. non-playing staff
Watford F.C. non-playing staff
Radcliffe F.C. players
Harlow Town F.C. players
Alumni of the University of Bolton
Liverpool F.C. non-playing staff
People from Billinge, Merseyside
Association football midfielders